Lugn is a Swedish surname. Notable people with the surname include: 

Kristina Lugn (1948–2020), Swedish poet and dramatist
Robert Lugn (1923–2016), Swedish Army officer

See also
Lunn

Swedish-language surnames